Lujule was a  county in then Yei River State, South Sudan that existed April 2016 and 22 February 2020.

Social Services

Schools 

 kirinya primary school
 gomonja primary school
 yugufe primary school

Health Services

Churches 
1.Aworo parish

2.bodàndi church

3.panyana dioses

History 
On 2 October 2015, President Salva Kiir issued a decree establishing 28 states in place of the 10 constitutionally established states. The decree established the new states largely along ethnic lines. A number of opposition parties and civil society groups challenged the constitutionality of the decree. Kiir later resolved to take it to parliament for approval as a constitutional amendment. In November of that year, the South Sudanese parliament empowered President Kiir to create new states. David Lokonga Moses was appointed Governor on 24 December 2015.

After the split up, Yei River State broke down even further for a total of 13 counties in the state (created in April 2016). The 10 counties are part of the 180 counties in South Sudan. The 13counties are consisted of the following:

 Former Kajo-Keji County:
 Kajo-Keji
 ŋepo (Nyepo)
 Kangapo 
 Liwolo
 Former Lainya County:
 Lainya
 Kupera
 Former Morobo County
 Morobo
 Lujule
 Former Yei River County:
 Yei
 Otogo
 Tore
 Mugwo

Climate
Lujulo has a Tropical savanna climate (Aw) with dry, warm winters and wet, cooler summers. Due to its elevation, the average temperatures are slightly cooler than many places with this climate.

References

Counties of South Sudan